The Committee of Safety, formally the Citizen's Committee of Public Safety, was a 13-member group of the Annexation Club. The group was composed of mostly Hawaiian subjects of American descent and American citizens who were members of the Missionary Party, as well as some foreign residents in the Kingdom of Hawaii. The group planned and carried out the overthrow of the Kingdom of Hawaii on January 17, 1893. The goal of this group was to achieve annexation of Hawaii by the United States. The new independent Republic of Hawaii government was thwarted in this goal by the administration of President Grover Cleveland, and it was not until 1898 that the United States Congress approved a joint resolution of annexation creating the U.S. Territory of Hawaii.

Formation
The Committee of Safety originated from a leadership group when members of the Missionary Party began to run as Independent Party candidates. For the elections of 1884 the Missionary Party strictly ran all candidates as Independent Party candidates. To ensure that Missionaries were on the Independent ticket the "Committee of Nine" was formed January 14, 1893, to assume the leadership position of the Independent Party. The Committee of Nine were staunchly loyal to the Missionary Party, having social and economic philosophies that reflected the Missionary values. The Independent Party won 13 seats and was the minority party in the Hawaii legislature. For the following elections of 1886 the committee reconvened, this time calling themselves the "Committee of Thirteen" due to the change in members. Their intent was to make the Independent Party the majority party in the legislature. At the end of the elections the Independents won ten seats, a net loss of three seats.

Hawaiian League

In January 1887 the Committee of Thirteen formed a secret society called the Hawaiian League. No official records were kept, but Lorrin A. Thurston (the grandson of American missionaries Asa Thurston and Lorrin Andrews) drafted the group's constitution. The group was headed by an executive committee of lawyers and businessmen mostly of non-aboriginal non-indigenous naturalized United States citizens. Membership grew through the year, including some German and British citizens, and a few part-Hawaiians.
Although the politicians changed the name of their party from "Missionary" to "Reform", many wanted to become part of the United States, not just reform the monarchy. 
This was why the Hawaiian League was also called the Annexation Club, although not often in public.

The Hawaiian League came into control of the Honolulu Rifles. Made of about 200 armed local (non-native) men, who fought under the command of enthusiastic annexationist Volney V. Ashford.
In June 1887, the Hawaiian League used the Rifles to force King Kalākaua to enact the Bayonet Constitution which limited his power. 
After Queen Liliuokalani came to power in 1891, she attempted to restore power to the throne. This caused the group to act again.

Overthrow

The precipitating event leading to the overthrow was the attempt by Queen Liliuokalani to promulgate a new constitution which would have strengthened the power of the monarch relative to the legislature in which Euro-American business elites held disproportionate power, a political situation that was a direct result of the 1887 constitution. The conspirators' stated goals were to depose the queen, overthrow the monarchy, and seek Hawaii's annexation to the United States.

On January 16, the Marshal of the Kingdom Charles B. Wilson was tipped off to the imminent planned coup. Wilson requested warrants to arrest the 13-member Committee of Safety, and put the Kingdom under martial law. Because the members had strong political ties with United States Government Minister John L. Stevens, the requests were repeatedly denied, fearing if approved, the arrests would escalate the situation. After a failed negotiation with Thurston, Wilson began to collect his men for the confrontation. Wilson and Captain of the Royal Household Guard, Samuel Nowlein, had rallied a force of 496 men who were kept at hand to protect the Queen.

The Revolution ignited on January 17 when a policeman was shot and wounded while trying to stop a wagon carrying weapons to the Honolulu Rifles. The Committee of Safety feared the shooting would bring government forces to rout out the conspirators and stop the coup before it could begin. The Rifles garrisoned Ali'iolani Hale across the street from ʻIolani Palace and waited for the Queen's response.

As these events were unfolding, the Committee of Safety expressed concern for the safety and property of American residents in Honolulu. The sailors and marines did not enter the Palace grounds or take over any buildings, and never fired a shot, but their presence served to intimidate royalist defenders. Historian William Russ states, "the injunction to prevent fighting of any kind made it impossible for the monarchy to protect itself." Due to the Queen's desire "to avoid any collision of armed forces, and perhaps the loss of life" for her subjects and after some deliberation, at the urging of advisers and friends, the Queen ordered her forces to surrender. The Honolulu Rifles took over government buildings, disarmed the Royal Guard, and declared a Provisional Government.

The Committee of Safety issued the following proclamation, read aloud on January 17 by its chairman Henry E. Cooper to a large crowd assembled in front of the royal residence Iolani Palace:

"First – The Hawaiian monarchial system of government is hereby abrogated.

Second – A Provisional Government for the control and management of public affairs and the protection of public peace is hereby established, to exist until terms of union with the United States of America have been negotiated and agreed upon".

The Hawaiian League unofficially adopted the American Flag to appeal to the US and promote annexation. The flag was raised over ʻIolani Palace by Stevens on January 17, 1893. The flag was eventually lowered by James H. Blount that April for spreading a false presumption that the US had taken control.

International response
During the overthrow, the Japanese Imperial Navy gunboat Naniwa was docked at Pearl Harbor. The gunboat's commander, Heihachiro Togo, who later commanded the Japanese battleship fleet at Tsushima, refused to accede to the Provisional Government's demands that he strike the colors of the Kingdom, but later lowered the colors on order of the Japanese Government. Along with every other international legations in Honolulu, the Japanese Consulate-General, Suburo Fujii, quickly recognized the Provisional Government as the legitimate successor to the monarchy.

Every government with a diplomatic presence in Hawaii recognized the Provisional Government within 48 hours of the overthrow, including the United States, although the recognition by the United States government and its further response is detailed in the section above on "American Response". Countries recognizing the new Provisional Government included Chile, Austria-Hungary, Mexico, Russia, the Netherlands, Germany, Sweden, Spain, Japan, Italy, Portugal, Great Britain, Denmark, Belgium, China, Peru, and France. When the Republic of Hawaii was declared on July 4, 1894, immediate recognition was given by every nation with diplomatic relations with Hawaii, except for Britain, whose response came in November.

Members of the committees

Committee of Nine
Joseph B. Atherton
William R. Castle
Sanford B. Dole
William W. Hall (1841–1910) Business partner of his printer father Edwin Oscar Hall
James A. Hopper (1831–1900)
Peter C. Jones
Henry W. Mist (1833–1895)
John H. Paty
William O. Smith

Committee of Thirteen

Joseph B. Atherton
Jonathan Austin
William H. Bailey
William R. Castle
Benjamin F. Dillingham
Sanford B. Dole
Henry F. Glade (1883–1894) German consul to Hawaii
William W. Hall
Peter C. Jones
Thomas May
John H. Paty
Lorrin A. Thurston
George N. Wilcox

Committee of Safety
Six Hawaiian subjects, five American citizens, a German subject, and a British subject signed the January 16 letter:

Hawaiian Kingdom subjects:

 Crister Bolte, naturalized Hawaiian subject of German birth, member
 William Richards Castle, Hawaiian subject, born in Honolulu 1849, attorney general for Kalākaua 1876, Hawaiian legislator 1878–88, member
 Chairman Henry Ernest Cooper, American citizen who arrived in 1890, denizen of the Kingdom, named chairman at mass meeting January 14, 1893 
 William Owen Smith, Hawaiian subject, born on Kauai 1838 of American missionaries, member
 Lorrin A. Thurston, Hawaiian subject, born in Hawaii of American grandparents, member
Henry Waterhouse, naturalized Hawaiian subject of Tasmanian birth, came to Hawaii 1851, member
William C. Wilder, naturalized Hawaiian subject, brother of Samuel Gardner Wilder, member

Non-subject Members:
Andrew Brown, Scottish, member
John Emmeluth, American citizen, member
Theodore F. Lansing, American citizen, member
John A. McCandless, American citizen, member
Frederick W. McChesney, American citizen, member
Edward Suhr, German citizen, member

Others who assisted in the overthrow:
Charles L. Carter, American, naturalized Hawaiian subject, member, son of Henry A. P. Carter, brother of George R. Carter, died during the 1895 counter-revolution
 Samuel Mills Damon, Hawaiian subject with American parents, vice president of Provisional Government
 Sanford B. Dole, Hawaiian subject with American parents, selected to head Provisional Government and Republic
 Peter Cushman Jones, American, naturalized Hawaiian subject, provisional government minister of finance
 James A. King, Scottish, named minister of interior

See also
 1887 Constitution of the Kingdom of Hawaii
 Reform Party of the Hawaiian Kingdom
 Provisional Government of Hawaii
 Republic of Hawaii
 Territory of Hawai'i

References

Further reading 

1880s coups d'état and coup attempts
1887 establishments in Hawaii
1890s coups d'état and coup attempts
1893 disestablishments in Hawaii
Coups d'état and coup attempts in the United States
Overthrow of the Hawaiian Kingdom
People associated with the overthrow of the Hawaiian Kingdom
Secret societies in the United States